Facklamia hominis is a Gram-positive and anaerobic bacteria from the family of Facklamia which has been isolated from humans. The genus Facklamia was first described in 1997 using 16S rRNA sequencing and has since been identified from both a wide range of animal sources and infrequently as a human pathogen.

References

External links
Type strain of Facklamia hominis at BacDive -  the Bacterial Diversity Metadatabase

Bacteria described in 1997
Lactobacillales